Banger or Bangers may refer to:

Film
Bangers (1995 film), a Philippine comedy film
Bangers (1999 film), an Australian short film
Banger Films, a production company

Noisemakers
Firecracker, a small, explosive noise maker
Thundersticks, plastic balloons that are used as noise makers

People
Edgar Henry Banger (1897–1968), British illustrator
Nicky Banger (born 1971), British footballer

Songs
"Banger" (song), a song by JME
 "The Banger", a song by Nigerian artist Runtown

Other uses
Banger (car), a decrepit vehicle
Sausage ("bangers" in the UK)
Bangalore torpedo, an explosive charge used by combat engineers
Banger, a pickleball player that returns most balls using a hard drive

See also
 
 
Bangerz (disambiguation)
Bangor (disambiguation)